.gd is the country code top-level domain (ccTLD) for Grenada.

March 2013 dispute over ownership of the .vg, .tc and .gd registries

Domain name registrars such as GoDaddy have stopped accepting new registrations for .vg, .tc and .gd domain names since March 2013. This is the result of a dispute over the ownership and control of AdamsNames Ltd. which had been the accredited registry by the IANA for those top level domains.  A former partner of AdamsNames Ltd. created a new company Meridian Ltd. which claimed to be the new accredited registry.

May 2013 freeze of the .gd zone
The National Telecommunications Regulatory Commission (NTRC) made the decision to move the .gd zone under the management of KSRegistry, running as nicGD, as of 1 May 2013. This was to ensure the integrity of the zone and to allow it remain in control and under the responsibility of the NTRC. KSRegistry, as a result of acquiring the zone, had to resolve any discrepancies that may have occurred during the dispute and chose to freeze the zone from changes until May 21, 2013. Since then, the zone has been re-opened with new policies.

See also
Internet in Grenada

References

External links
 IANA .gd whois information
 .gd registry website
 .gd domain registration website

Country code top-level domains
Communications in Grenada
Computer-related introductions in 1992

sv:Toppdomän#G